A death march is a forced march of prisoners.

Death marches during the Holocaust, death marches of concentration camp prisoners in 1944 and 1945

Death march may also refer to:
Death march (project management), a project that involves grueling overwork and (often) patently unrealistic expectations, and thus (in many cases) is destined to fail

Media (books and visual)
Death March (film), a 2013 film
Death March to the Parallel World Rhapsody, a Japanese novel (2013 ongoing), light novel, manga, and anime (2018) series

Music
Popular name of the funeral march movement of Piano Sonata No. 2
"Dead March", part of oratorio by Saul
Deathmarch (EP) by Swedish black metal band Marduk
"Deathmarch", Plague Angel by Marduk
"Deathmarch", from Liberation by 1349
Deathmarch EP, by The Grand Astoria

Other uses
Dodentocht, 100 km walking tour in Belgium

See also
Funeral march